The Psycho Ex-Wife (thepsychoexwife.com) was a blog that operated in the United States between 2007 and 2011. The site was shut down following an order by family court judge Diane Gibbons (Pennsylvania) who said that the website subjected the blogger's ex-wife to "outright cruelty" and could be harmful to the couple's children. The case received widespread news media attention as the blogger and his girlfriend argued online that the family court's decision was violating of his rights under the First Amendment to the U.S. Constitution and as he sought crowd funding to take the case to Pennsylvania Superior Court. Ultimately, a case was not heard before the Pennsylvania Superior Court, and the thepsychoexwife.com remained shut down. The Psycho Ex-Wife was the second website business of the bloggers closed by court order.

History 
Starting in May 2006, Anthony Morelli and Misty Weaver-Ostinato, his girlfriend, began publicly chronicling Morelli's custody battle and grievances about Morelli's wife, Allison Morelli, on BPDFamily.com, a support group for family members of people suffering from Borderline Personality Disorder. The Morelli's had been divorced since 2004, with shared custody of their sons and Morelli was fighting his ex-wife's accusations of child abuse and other violations of the divorce agreement. Morelli and Weaver-Ostinato posted 4,500 messages at BPDFamily.com anonymously as "Mr. M" and "mmm".

In response to increasing pressure from the moderators at BPDFamily.com to temper his aggressive and caustic style,  Morelli and Weaver-Ostinato set up an online blog. There Morelli wrote anonymously as "LM" and used pseudonyms (e.g. PEW for "Psycho Ex-Wife") when referring to his ex wife.

In December 2007, ThePsychoExWife.com domain was created by Morelli and Weaver-Ostinato.

In September 2009, Morelli and Weaver-Ostinato started a quasi-legal consultation service together, named Mr. Custody Coach, for clients going through high-conflict divorce and custody cases.  Misty Weaver-Ostinato had previously sold quasi-legal consultation services (bankruptcy filings) and had been shut down by the Federal Bankruptcy Court in North Carolina for fraudulent, unfair and deceptive acts and for practicing law without a license.

ThePsychoExWife.com attracted an audience who shared their own divorce and custody experiences in the couple's advice column. Morelli and Weaver-Ostinato eventually expanded the website to include a members-only message board to publicly discuss divorce, child custody, borderline personality disorder, and parental alienation syndrome. Morelli started writing reviews for divorce-related books and websites for its "suggested reading" list. They also began selling advertising space on the website.

Morelli and Weaver-Ostinato claimed that within four years of its launch, ThePsychoExWife.com was attracting over 200,000 followers a month, however independent tracking services like Alexa showed a significantly a smaller audience.

Controversial Editorial Content 
Morelli and Weaver-Ostinato wrote thousands of controversial blog posts on this subject. Morelli claimed that he had spent $80,000 on legal expenses subsequent to the divorce fighting his ex-wife's accusations of child abuse and other violations of the divorce agreement.

According to Morelli, blogging was a healthy place to "vent" his feelings about his failed marriage, divorce, and subsequent custody battle over their two children. Amongst the more choice insults for his former partner Allison Morelli were that 
{{quote|"she looked like Jabba the Hut" and "suffers from Borderline Personality Disorder". "She’s on the precipice of 40 and probably looks all 50-years of it," and that she was "terroristic".

Misty Weaver-Ostinato posted that: 

Morelli used the blog to publicly expose alleged harassment from his ex-wife and former in-laws with e-mail, instant messages, and voice mail.

In addition to his struggles with divorce, Morelli wrote about his frustrations with family court.

Court rulings 
Morelli's former wife, Allison Morelli, complained about it to the Bucks County, Pennsylvania, family court. At a June 6, 2011, hearing, Judge Diane Gibbons ordered Anthony Morelli to take the website down. In that hearing and in a second hearing a week later, she said that the website statements about Allison Morelli were:

Although the parents disagreed on whether their sons had actually read the blog, the court determined their children were aware of the website. Judge Gibbons also banned him from mentioning his ex-wife or his children on any public media.

At the second hearing, Anthony Morelli contested the judge's order, arguing that it was an infringement on his and Weaver-Ostinato's freedom of speech. Gibbons told Morelli: 

She additionally threatened Morelli with contempt of court. This is the second website operated by Misty Weaver-Ostinato that was shut down by court order. In 2004, Misty Weaver-Ostinato and Motherhood Media,Inc. were shut down by the Federal Bankruptcy Court in North Carolina for fraudulent, unfair and deceptive acts and for practicing law without a license.

Although ultimately forced to comply with the family court ruling, Morelli believed that his first and fourteenth amendment rights had been violated and hired attorney Kevin Handy to challenge the decision in Pennsylvania Superior Court. Handy called Judge Gibbons' order "a classic example of an overly broad and unenforceable prior restraint on free speech". He cited Brown v. Entertainment Merchants Association, in which the U.S. Supreme Court struck down a California state ban on the sale of violent video games to minors, as an example of an unlawful restriction on constitutionally protected speech for the purposes of child welfare. Morelli and Weaver-Ostinato also started another website, SaveThePsychoExWife.com to raise funds for their legal defense. The website had raised $8,000 in donations. No accounting of Morelli's actual costs were ever reported.

Legal analysis 
In Morelli, the judge did not seem to consider the implications of her order on the free speech rights of the father; instead, she considered only how the children would choose if they could and which outcome would benefit them the most. Recall the judge’s assertion that the children “don’t want to hear that dad is a bastard . . . or mommy’s a bitch because that’s someone they love, and when you say something about someone they love, you hurt them.

According to the University of Pennsylvania Law Review, the case law is dead-locked over whether the children’s best interests should override parental free speech rights.

When looking at the courts that have ruled in favor of children’s best interests there is no clear standard for defining children’s best interests. When looking at the courts that have ruled in favor of parental free speech rights, the children’s best interests were not considered.

Robert D. Richards, founding director of Pennsylvania State University's Pennsylvania Center for the First Amendment, felt Gibbons' "did overstep her bounds a little bit" adding that even if the blog was defamatory the correct action was to sue for libel not block the speech.

Media response 
The story was picked up by the media within weeks of the ruling. Response was largely negative with mainstream media outlets emphasizing the derogatory nature of his posts. Criticism was primarily focused on the insulting language used on the website's introduction, in which Morelli referred to his ex-wife as "Jabba The Hut with less personality", rather than other topics discussed by Morelli. His hometown newspaper The Intelligencer published a particularly harsh editorial and stated that Morelli "may have a right to embarrass and belittle his children’s mother in a very public way, but that doesn’t mean he should do it". Janet Shan of the Hinterland Gazette was one of the few voices supportive of Morelli pointing out that the author had never threatened his ex-wife and wrote "if the gist of the posts over the four years was to express frustration with the divorce process through the courts, the emotional toll it has taken on him and his children, and the angst he feels going through the process, then he has every right under the Constitution to voice that frustration".

Morelli's case had support from a number of prominent First Amendment legal experts. Robert D. Richards, founding director of Pennsylvania State University's Pennsylvania Center for the First Amendment, felt Gibbons' "did overstep her bounds a little bit" adding that even if the blog was defamatory the correct action was to sue for libel not block the speech. UCLA law professor and fellow blogger Eugene Volokh of The Volokh Conspiracy strongly objected the ruling both on his website, and during an on-air interview with WHYY-FM, calling the family court judge's order "a blatantly unconstitutional exercise of her authority. She’s flaunting (sic) the U.S. Constitution." CBS Los Angeles legal analyst Royal Oakes also discussed the case commenting that "it makes the McCourt divorce look genteel by comparison". Doug Mataconis of OutsideTheBeltway.com brought up the issue of a possible conflict of interest, as many of Morelli's posts dealt with his negative opinion of the family court system, and questioned if it was appropriate to take the entire blog offline rather than removing posts specifically about his ex-wife.

Both Anthony and Allison Morelli appeared on The Today Show with Amy Robach and Matt Lauer in early August; afterwards the case was discussed by Star Jones and psychiatrist Dr. Gail Saltz. Lauer said during the show that Morelli "clearly does not have the best interests of his children in mind." That same week the case was discussed on Fox News' "Kelly's Court" with host Megyn Kelly and guest panelists ex-prosecutor Jonna Spilbor and legal analyst Mercedes Colwin. The case was also covered by major U.S. and international newspapers including the New York Daily News, San Francisco Chronicle and Time. Gibbons declined to comment on the case.

The response from the blogosphere was mixed. Female columnists from CafeMom, The Huffington Post, Jezebel, and iVillage.com were all heavily critical of the blog. One exception was Yahoo! Shine senior editor Lylah Alphonse who commented "the posts that Morelli and Weaver-Ostinato wrote at The Psycho Ex-Wife may have been libelous, but libel is a civil court issue, not a criminal one". William Belle of Salon.com compared Morelli's behavior to that of Tricia Walsh who posted insulting videos of her husband on YouTube in order gain an advantage in their divorce settlement and her attempts to have the pre-nuptial agreement thrown out.

Morelli found some of his strongest support in the fathers' rights movement. Fathers & Families was one of the first websites to report the blog's shut down. Dr. Tara J. Palmatier of Shrink4Men.com defended the website and was concerned over the abusive behavior documented by Morelli during his four years of blogging.

Taking issue with his Today Show appearance, Morelli contested the media's perception that the sole purpose of his blog was for "bashing my ex-wife". The blogger also defended his writing style as a means of attracting readers to the website, especially those experiencing similar issues, but also as a way to keep his sense of humor.

Blogger Nathan Hacker of the family law firm Cordell & Cordell cited the case as a warning to avoid "going public" by releasing information about divorce and child custody cases.

References 

American blogs
Defunct American websites
Internet censorship in the United States
Internet forums
Internet properties established in 2007
Internet properties disestablished in 2011
Law blogs
United States Free Speech Clause case law